Andy Oppenheimer AIExpE MIABTI (born 1953) is a UK-based expert and consultant in counter-terrorism and CBRNE (chemical, biological, radiological, nuclear weapons and explosives). Since 2001 he has written articles, edited journals, and presented at conferences and professional seminars worldwide.
He has been editor of several journals on defence and security, including Chemical, Biological & Nuclear Warfare (CBNW) from 2009, Jane's Nuclear, Biological and Chemical Defence and NBC International from 2006 to 2008, and was co-editor of Jane's World Armies from 2002 to 2004. He has served as a CBRN consultant for Jane's Consultancy Group and Oxford Analytica.

Personal life 

Born in 1953, Oppenheimer grew up in Leeds and Liverpool and graduated from Liverpool University in 1974. He then moved to London and worked in popular science and academic publishing for over 20 years before becoming an author and subject matter expert in defence and counterterrorism in 2001. He is not related to J. Robert Oppenheimer.

Professional career 
During the 1980s and 1990s, Oppenheimer conducted research into nuclear weapons and the Cold War along with research into the Irish Republican Army and improvised explosive devices. He became a Member of the International Association of Bomb Technicians (IABTI) in 2008 and an Associate Member of the UK Institute of Explosives Engineers in 2011. 
From 2012 to 2015 he was a Course Contributor to the University of St. Andrews Certificate of Terrorism Studies, conducted by the Centre for the Study of Terrorism and Political Violence, writing the CBRN Weapons in Terrorism Course Module in 2012 and the IEDs: Threats & Countermeasures Course Module in 2013. He has written for defence journals including Military Technology, CBNW, RUSI Journal, Strategic Intelligence Review, Counter-IED Report, Langley Intelligence Group Network, Police Oracle, Explosives Engineering, and several Jane's Information Group (now Jane's IHS) publications from 2002 to 2006, including Jane's Terrorism & Security Monitor and Jane's Intelligence Digest. He was Editor of Jane's Nuclear, Biological and Chemical Defence from 2006 to 2008. 
Oppenheimer has made TV appearances and radio broadcasts as an expert on terrorism and CBRNE and acts as a consultant for films and documentaries, including Mountbatten: Death of a Royal (History Channel, RTE), Gaddafi and the IRA (ITV), The World's Deadliest Arms Race (ITV), Terror Attacks That Shocked Britain (Current TV, Sky), and Spooks (BBC1).

Published work 
His first book IRA: The Bombs and the Bullets – A History of Deadly Ingenuity (Irish Academic Press, 2008) covers 150 years of strategic, tactical, and operational details, with penetrating analysis of the IRA's mission, doctrine, targeting, and acquisition of weapons and explosives.  

He has since published two science-fiction novels on Amazon – Fields of Orion (I): An Odyssey (2019) and Fields of Orion (II) The Mission (2020) - with the strong themes of bomb disposal, heroism, terrorism, and first contact.  

In 2021 he published Stars of Orion: An Astronomy Special: a collection of photos and stories of the Constellation Orion by 45 amateur and professional astronomers. Hosting the book as Orion the Hunter, he draws on experience working for Omni (magazine) from 1978 to 1983 with Patrick Moore and from a love of cosmology and Greek mythology.

Music 
Andy Oppenheimer is also a singer-songwriter of electronic pop music since the early 1980s, when he formed Oppenheimer Analysis (OA) with producer Martin Lloyd (aka Analysis, d. 2013). They released the tape-only album New Mexico in 1982, which grew to have a following with the emerging cassette culture. In 2005 Oppenheimer Analysis re-formed and an EP of early material was the first release by the New York-based Minimal Wave label. 'The Devil's Dancers' is a hallmark electro track played in clubs and online DJ playlists.   

Oppenheimer also wrote and sang from 2010 to 2015 as Touching the Void with veteran producer Mark Warner (of Rossetti's Compass and formerly of the 1980s band Sudeten Creche) and released an album, Love, Longing and Loss in 2015. He continues to create songs as Oppenheimer MkII with producer Mahk Rumbae (of experimental electronic band Mitra Mitra). Oppenheimer MkII released their first album The Presence of the Abnormal in 2012 and an EP, Out in the Field, on Northern Irish record label TONN Recordings in 2021.   

Oppenheimer has also painted pictures from childhood and his surrealist works were featured in several exhibitions in London in the late 1990s. His main pastime is archery, shooting at clubs in London and Brighton.

Books
 2008: IRA: The Bombs and the Bullets 
 2019: Fields of Orion: An Odyssey
 2020: Fields of Orion (II) The Mission
 2021: The Hunter’s Story by Orion
 2021: Stars of Orion: An Astronomy Special

Discography
A full list of Andy Oppenheimer's music releases can be viewed on Discogs (see external links)

Albums
 1982: New Mexico as Oppenheimer Analysis
 2013: The Presence of the Abnormal as Oppenheimer MkII
 2015: Love, Longing and Loss as Touching the Void

EPs
 2005: Der Wissenschaftler as Oppenheimer Analysis
 2005: Oppenheimer Analysis as Oppenheimer Analysis
 2015: Line of Sight EP as Oppenheimer MkII
 2021: Out in the Field as Oppenheimer MkII

Singles
 2010: Oppenheimer Analysis as Oppenheimer Analysis
 2011: Science / Washington as Oppenheimer Analysis
 2012: Parallel Lives as Touching the Void
 2014: Obsession / In this Together as Touching the Void

References

External links
 Andy Oppenheimer’s consultancy website
 Andy Oppenheimer’s Orion blogsite
 Twitter: @warrior_orion
 Andy Oppenheimer on Discogs
 Touching the Void on Bandcamp
 Oppenheimer MkII on Bandcamp
 Oppenheimer Analysis on Facebook

1953 births
British consultants
Living people
Alumni of the University of Liverpool
People from Liverpool
British electronic musicians
Minimal wave musicians